Areias is a municipality in the state of São Paulo in Brazil. It is part of the Metropolitan Region of Vale do Paraíba e Litoral Norte. The population is 3,896 (2020 est.) in an area of 305.23 km². The elevation is 509 m.

The municipality contains part of the  Mananciais do Rio Paraíba do Sul Environmental Protection Area, created in 1982 to protect the sources of the Paraíba do Sul river.

Population history

Demographics

According to the 2000 IBGE Census, the population was 3,600, of which 2,452 were urban and 1,148 are rural.  The average life expectancy for the municipality was 65.57 years.  The literacy rate was at 84.97%.

References

External links
  http://www.areias.sp.gov.br
  Areias on citybrazil.com.br
  Areias on Explorevale
  Guia Vale do Paraíba - O que fazer em Areias

Municipalities in São Paulo (state)